Sir Frank Ernest Gibson (11 July 1878 – 31 December 1965) was an Australian politician.

Born at Egerton, Victoria, to Irish-born policeman Alexander Gibson and Louisa Herring, he attended Grenville College and the School of Mines at Ballarat before moving to Western Australia as a qualified pharmacist, setting up a business in Leonora in 1909. He married Jean Rodger Dunkley on 10 August 1911 at Kalgoorlie.

In 1914 he moved to Fremantle, of which he was mayor for twenty-nine years (1919–23, 1926–51). Gibson gave his official farewell speech on 19 November 1951 at last council meeting before the elections were held on 24 November, where William F Samson was elected unopposed as mayor.

In 1921 he was elected to the Western Australian Legislative Assembly as the Nationalist member for Fremantle; he was defeated in 1924. He was later a member of the Western Australian Legislative Council from 1942 to 1956, in 1945 being one of the foundation members of the Liberal Party. He was knighted in 1948.

Later in life Gibson and his wife resided at the Orient Hotel, he died in hospital at Shenton Park on 31 December 1965. Frank Gibson Park, a netball facility in Fremantle, is named after him.

References

1878 births
1965 deaths
Nationalist Party of Australia members of the Parliament of Western Australia
Liberal Party of Australia members of the Parliament of Western Australia
Members of the Western Australian Legislative Assembly
Members of the Western Australian Legislative Council
Australian Knights Bachelor
People from Victoria (Australia)
Australian pharmacists
Federation University Australia alumni
Mayors of Fremantle